The Oldham Methodist Church is a historic church at Main Street and Epton Avenue in Oldham, South Dakota, USA. It was built in 1914 and was added to the National Register in 1987.

It has an L-shaped plan with a bell tower rising from the intersection of its two gables. It was deemed notable as a "rare, practically uncorrupted example" of "the L-shaped form in its pure state. Other original features include Gothic arched window and door openings, decorative bargeboard, hardwood interior appointments and furniture, lighting fixtures, and a pressed-metal ceiling."

References

Methodist churches in South Dakota
Churches on the National Register of Historic Places in South Dakota
Churches completed in 1914
Churches in Kingsbury County, South Dakota
National Register of Historic Places in Kingsbury County, South Dakota